Edward Russell (born 7 September 1989) is an English-Singaporean television presenter, host, and actor. He is a permanent presenter on Fox Sports Asia, anchoring Fox Sports Central Asia, and helming their MotoGP coverage and Friday Night Football. He was currently served as the radio DJ for Class 95 during the afternoon slot.

Early life 

After attending The Perse School in Cambridge, Edward completed his secondary studies at Hale School and then attended The University of Western Australia, where he graduated with a Bachelor of Arts, a Bachelor of Commerce, and a Post Graduate English Degree with First Class Honours

Career

Television 

In 2014, Edward made his acting debut in Spouse for House on Mediacorp Channel 5 playing the role of Sam.
In the same year, he also played the role of Josh in Kosmopolitan on Mediacorp Suria.

Edward is best known as a presenter on Fox Sports Asia, where he helms their live coverage of the MotoGP World Championship, alongside pundit Matteo Guerinoni.
He also anchors the channel's flagship show Fox Sports Central Asia, presents Friday Night Football and reports onsite from various sporting events including Formula 1, AFF Championship, Australian Open and French Open

He also presents an Asia-wide syndicated travel show and has produced a number of travel pieces in partnership with the Taiwan Tourism Bureau

Writing 

Edward is the Men's Fashion and Lifestyle Correspondent for Buro 24/7

Personal life 

Edward has been selected as one of Cleo Magazine's Bachelors of the Year and Nüyou Magazine's Men We Love.

References

External links 

1989 births
Living people
Fox Sports announcers
Television personalities from London
University of Western Australia alumni
People educated at The Perse School
People educated at Hale School